James Fiddes BEM (3 October 1916 – 1970) was a Scottish footballer; he was a versatile player who featured at outside right, inside right and right half during his career.

Born in Grangemouth, Fiddes served in the Royal Air Force during the Second World War and played for Rangers, Falkirk and Stenhousemuir. Having won a Scottish Cup (1936) and a Scottish Football League title (1938–39) with Rangers before the war, he also played for Falkirk in the 1947–48 Scottish League Cup Final.

After retiring from football in the 1950s, he joined BP as a tanker driver at Grangemouth Refinery. He became a prominent member of the Transport and General Workers' Union, serving as chairman, secretary, collector and shop steward of 7/51 Branch at the depot and by 1970 as chairman of the TGWU's Commercial Services Group.

Fiddes was awarded the British Empire Medal (BEM) in the 1970 New Year Honours for his services to the petroleum industry and the TGWU.

Footnotes

References
TGWU Record, February 1970

1916 births
1970 deaths
Scottish footballers
Scottish Football League players
Scottish Junior Football Association players
Highland Football League players
Rangers F.C. players
Falkirk F.C. players
Dunfermline Athletic F.C. wartime guest players
Blackpool F.C. wartime guest players
Recipients of the British Empire Medal
Royal Air Force personnel of World War II
Truck drivers
Scottish trade unionists
BP people
Stenhousemuir F.C. players
Ross County F.C. players
Association football wing halves
Association football inside forwards
People from Grangemouth
Footballers from Falkirk (council area)